Religion in New Zealand encompasses a wide range of groups and beliefs. Almost half (48.6 percent) of New Zealanders stated they had no religion in the 2018 census and 6.7 percent made no declaration. However, Christianity remains the most common religion; 37.3 percent of the population at the 2018 census identified as Christian, with Anglicanism being the largest denomination. Around six percent of the population is affiliated with non-Christian religions. Hinduism is the second-most popular religion, claiming 2.7 percent of the population, and Sikhism is the fastest-growing faith. 

Before European colonisation the religion of the indigenous Māori population was polytheistic and animistic. The first Christian service in New Zealand waters was conducted by a French priest, Paul-Antoine Léonard de Villefeix, on Christmas Day 1769. The first Christian service on land was led by Rev. Samuel Marsden on Christmas Day 1814. Subsequent efforts of missionaries and the early church resulted in most Māori converting to Christianity. The majority of 19th-century European migrants came from the British Isles, establishing the three dominant British Christian denominations in New Zealand – Anglicanism, Catholicism and Presbyterianism. The tendency for Scottish migrants to settle in Otago and Southland saw Presbyterianism predominate in these regions while Anglicanism predominated elsewhere; the effect of this is still seen in religious affiliation statistics today.

The number of people affiliated with Christianity has declined since the 1990s, and those stating that they have no religious affiliation have increased. With increased immigration to New Zealand, especially from Asia, the number of people affiliating with non-Christian religions has largely increased.

New Zealand has no state religion or established church and freedom of religion has been protected since the signing of the Treaty of Waitangi. The monarch of New Zealand is, however, required to be Protestant.

History 
The first Christian service conducted in New Zealand waters was likely to have been Catholic liturgies celebrated by Father Paul-Antoine Léonard de Villefeix, the Dominican chaplain of the ship Saint Jean Baptiste commanded by the French navigator and explorer Jean-François-Marie de Surville. Villefeix was the first Christian clergyman to set foot in New Zealand, and probably said Mass on board the ship near Whatuwhiwhi in Doubtless Bay on Christmas Day 1769. He is reported to have also led prayers for the sick the previous day and to have conducted Christian burials.
New Zealand's religious history after the arrival of Europeans saw substantial missionary activity, with Māori generally converting to Christianity voluntarily (compare forced conversions elsewhere in the world). The Anglican Church Missionary Society (CMS) sent missionaries to settle in New Zealand. Samuel Marsden of the Church Missionary Society (chaplain in New South Wales) officiated at its first service on Christmas Day in 1814, at Oihi Bay, a small cove in Rangihoua Bay in the Bay of Islands, at the invitation of chiefs Te Pahi and Ruatara, considered to have been the first preaching of the gospel in New Zealand. The CMS founded its first mission at Rangihoua Bay in the Bay of Islands in 1814 and over the next decade established farms and schools in the area. In June 1823 Wesleydale, the first Wesleyan Methodist mission in New Zealand, was established at Kaeo, near Whangaroa Harbour. Jean Baptiste Pompallier was the first Catholic bishop to come to New Zealand, arriving in 1838. With a number of Marist Brothers, Pompallier organised the Catholic Church throughout the country. George Augustus Selwyn became the first Anglican Bishop of New Zealand in 1841. In 1892 the New Zealand Church Missionary Society (NZCMS) formed in a Nelson church hall and the first New Zealand missionaries were sent overseas soon after.

Though in England the Anglican Church was an established state church, by the middle of the 19th century even the Anglicans themselves sometimes doubted this arrangement, while the other major denominations of the new colony (Presbyterians, Methodist and Catholics, for example) obviously preferred that the local situation allowed for all their groups.

The first recorded communal Jewish service in New Zealand was held on 7 January 1843 in Wellington, although individual Jews were amongst earlier explorers and settlers.

Waves of new immigrants brought their particular (usually Christian) faiths with them. Initial denominational distribution very much reflected the fact that local immigrant communities started small and often came from comparatively small regions in the origin countries in Great Britain. As a result, by the time of the 1921 census, no uniform distribution existed amongst non-Māori Christians, with Presbyterians as the dominant group in Otago and Southland, Anglicans in the Far North, the East Cape and various other areas including Banks Peninsula, while Methodists flourished mainly in Taranaki and the Manawatu. Catholicism meanwhile was the dominant religion on the West Coast with its many mining concerns, and in Central Otago. The Catholic Church, while not particularly dominant in terms of pure numbers, became especially known throughout the country in the early and middle 20th century for its strong stance on education, establishing large numbers of schools.

Beginning in the mid-1960s church membership and attendance declined, and in 2013 42% of the population said they had no religion. Immigration since 1991 has led to rapid growth in the number of adherents of religions such as Hinduism, Buddhism and Sikhism, particularly in Auckland.

According to a 2019 survey, nearly four in ten New Zealanders lacked trust in evangelical Christians.

Demographics

Religious affiliation 
New Zealand censuses have collected data on religious affiliation since 1851. Statistics New Zealand (the state agency that collects statistics on religion and other demographics) state that:

One complication in interpreting religious affiliation data in New Zealand is the large proportion who object to answering the question –  roughly 313,000 respondents in 2018. Most reporting of percentages is based on the total number of responses, rather than the total population.

In the early 20th century New Zealand census data indicates that the vast majority of New Zealanders affiliated with Christianity. The total percentages in the 1921 non-Māori census were: 45% Anglicans, 19.9% Presbyterians, 13.6% Catholics, 9.5% Methodists and 11.2% Others. Statistics for Māori in particular became available only from 1936, with 35.8% Anglicans, 19.9% Rātana, 13.9% Catholics, 7.2% Ringatū, 7.1% Methodists, 6.5% Latter-day Saints, 1.3% Methodists and 8.3% Others recorded at this census.

Religious affiliation statistics 
The table below is based on religious affiliation data recorded at the last four censuses for usually resident people. Figures and percentages may not add to 100 percent as it is possible for people to state more than one religion. The trend indicators are based on the change in percentage of the population, not the number of adherents.

The 2018 census had an unusually low (83%) response rate. Statistics New Zealand subsequently calculated the 2018 census statistics based on the combination of 2018 census responses (82.9%), 2013 census responses (8.2%) and imputation (8.8%). The reported results are deemed to be high quality, but are not completely reliable.

Significant trends

Christianity – historically the largest religious group – is declining, while stating no religion and affiliation to other (minority) religions is increasing. Statistics New Zealand report that about 80% of the largest non-Christian religious groups are composed of immigrants, almost half of whom have arrived in New Zealand since 2000. The exceptions to this are traditional Māori religion, Judaism (24% immigrant) and Bahá'í (20% immigrant). Mirroring contemporary trends in immigration to New Zealand, immigrant religions increased fastest between the 2006 and 2013 censuses; Sikh by 102% to 19,191, Hindu by 39% to 89,319, Islam by 28% to 46,149, and Buddhist by 11% to 58,404. Hinduism emerged as the second-largest religious group in New Zealand after Christianity in the 2006 census. Of the major ethnic groups in New Zealand, people belonging to European and Māori ethnicities were the most likely to be irreligious, with 46.9 percent and 46.3 percent stating so in the 2013 census. Those belonging to Pacific and Middle Eastern/Latin American/African were least likely to be irreligious at 17.5 percent and 17.0 percent respectively.

In 2008 Massey University conducted an International Social Survey Programme survey in New Zealand. Around one thousand New Zealanders above the age of 18 sent mail responses to questions on religious belief and practice. Results indicated that 27% of the population strongly believed in God, 45% believed in God or a higher power at least some of the time or to some extent, 15% were agnostic, and 13% were atheist (with a 3% margin of error).

In May 2018, McCrindle published The Faith and Belief in New Zealand Report. The report was commissioned by the Wilberforce Foundation. The results showed that more than half of New Zealanders (55%) do not identify with any main religion, indicating that New Zealand is a largely secular nation. The related infographic showed that, of the 33% who identified with Christianity, 16% were church-goers (attending at least monthly) and 9% were "Active Practisers" (described as "extremely involved").

Regional trends

Immigration and settlement trends have led to religious differences between the various regions of New Zealand. The 19th-century settlement of Scottish immigrants in Otago (originally under the auspices of the  Free Church of Scotland in 1848) and Southland continues to influence the dominance of Presbyterianism in the south of the South Island. The English mainly settled in the North Island and Upper South Island, hence the dominance of Anglicanism in these areas (especially Canterbury, where the Church of England sponsored the 1850 settlement through the Canterbury Association).

Subsequent migration trends have led to clusters of distinct religious practice. Catholics of Polish origin (many connected with the  re-settlements from Siberia in 1944) have a presence (for example) in the Wellington region.
Filipinos have become a noticeable element in the Roman Catholic communities of Southland.

In the 2013 census, two of New Zealand's sixteen regions had a Christian majority:  Southland (51.9 percent) and  Hawke's Bay (50.5 percent), and two regions had a non-religious majority: Tasman (51.4 percent) and Nelson (51.0 percent).

Jedi census phenomenon

Encouraged by an informal email campaign, over 53,000 people listed themselves as Jedi in the 2001 census (over 1.5% of responses). If the Jedi response had been accepted as valid it would have been the second-largest religion in New Zealand, behind Christianity. However, Statistics New Zealand treated Jedi responses as "Answer understood, but will not be counted". In the next census, in 2006, the number of reported Jedis decreased to 20,000.

Religions

Christianity

After the arrival of large numbers of European immigrants (most of whom were British), Māori enthusiastically adopted Christianity in the early 19th century, and to this day, Christian prayer (karakia) is the expected way to begin and end Māori public gatherings of many kinds. Christianity became the major religion of the country, with the  Anglican, Catholic and Presbyterian churches all establishing themselves strongly. The arrival of other groups of immigrants did little to change this, as Pacific Islanders and other primarily Christian ethnic groups dominated immigration until the 1970s.

In the following decades, Christianity declined somewhat in percentage terms, mostly due to people declaring themselves as having no religion as well as by the growth of non-Christian religions. The five largest Christian denominations in 2001 remained the largest in 2006. The Catholic and Methodist denominations increased, but the Anglican denomination, the Presbyterian, Congregation and Reformed denomination, and undefined Christian denominations decreased. While smaller groups, there were larger percentage increases in affiliations with other Christian denominations between 2001 and 2006: Orthodox Christian religions increased by 37.8 percent, affiliation with Evangelical, Born Again and Fundamentalist religions increased by 25.6 percent, and affiliation with Pentecostal religions increased by 17.8 percent.

Despite strong affiliation to Christianity by New Zealanders throughout the country's history, church attendance in New Zealand has never been high compared to other Western nations. Research by the Bible Society of New Zealand in 2008 indicated that 15% of New Zealanders attend church at least once a week, and 20% attend at least once a month.

According to the 2018 census, 10.1% identified as Catholic or Roman Catholic, 6.8% are Anglican, 6.6% are Undefined Christian, 5.2% are Presbyterian, 1.3% are Māori Christian, and 8.6% reported affiliation to other Christian groups.

Hinduism

Hinduism is the second largest religion in New Zealand after Christianity, with over 123,000 adherents according to the 2018 census, constituting 2.63% of the New Zealand population. The number of Hindus in New Zealand grew modestly after the 1990s when the immigration laws was changed.

Islam

Islam in New Zealand began with the arrival of Muslim Chinese gold prospectors in the 1870s. The first Islamic organisation in New Zealand, the New Zealand Muslim Association, was established in Auckland in 1950. 1960 saw the arrival of the first imam, Maulana Said Musa Patel, from Gujarat, India. Large-scale Muslim immigration began in the 1970s with the arrival of Fiji Indians, followed in the 1990s by refugees from various war-torn countries. In April 1979 the three regional Muslim organisations of Canterbury, Wellington and Auckland, joined together to create the only national Islamic body – the Federation of Islamic Associations of New Zealand. Early in the 1990s many migrants were admitted under New Zealand's refugee quota, from war zones in Somalia, Bosnia, Afghanistan, Kosovo and Iraq. Since the 11 September attacks there was a spike in conversions to Islam among Maori prisoners in jail.

In the 2018 census, 61,455 people, identified themselves as Muslim constituting 1.32% of the total population making it the third largest religion in the country.

Buddhism

Buddhism is the fourth largest religion in New Zealand, at 1.13% of the population. In 2007 the Fo Guang Shan Temple was opened in Auckland for the promotion of Humanistic Buddhism. It is the largest Buddhist temple in New Zealand.

Most of the Buddhists in New Zealand are migrants from Asia with significant New Zealanders converted to Buddhism ranging from 15,000-20,000.

Judaism

The history of Jewish people in New Zealand begins in the 1830s with the earliest known settler Joel Samuel Polack. Prominent New Zealand Jews in history include 19th-century Premier Julius Vogel and at least five Auckland mayors, including Dove-Myer Robinson, and a chief justice (Sir Michael Myers). Former Prime Minister John Key is of part Ashkenazi Jewish descent, although he did not practice Judaism.

The Jewish population in New Zealand increased from 6,636 in the 2001 census to 6,867 in the 2013 census. However it decreased to 5,274 in the 2018 census, possibly because of security concerns by Jews over the "digital-first" online census format introduced that year.

The majority of New Zealand Jews reside in Auckland and Wellington, though there is also a significant Jewish community in Dunedin which is believed to have the world's southernmost permanent synagogue. In 2018 census, 0.11% of the population identified as Jewish/Judaism.

Baháʼí Faith

The first Baháʼí in the Antipodes was Englishwoman Dorothea Spinney who arrived in Auckland from New York in 1912. About 1913 there were two converts – Robert Felkin who had met 'Abdu'l-Bahá in London in 1911 and moved to New Zealand in 1912 and is considered a Baháʼí by 1914 and Margaret Stevenson who first heard of the religion in 1911 and by her own testimony was a Bahá'í in 1913. The first Baháʼí Spiritual Assembly In New Zealand was elected in 1926 and their first independent National Spiritual Assembly in 1957. By 1963 there were four Assemblies. In the 2006 census 0.07% of respondents, or 2,772 people, identified themselves as Baháʼí. In the 2018 census 0.05% of respondents, or 2,925 people, reported an affiliation to the Baháʼí Faith. There are some 45 local assemblies and smaller registered groups.

Māori religion

Traditional Māori religion – that is, the pre-European belief system of Māori people – was little modified in its essentials from that of their tropical Eastern Polynesian homeland, conceiving of everything, including natural elements and all living things, as connected by common descent through whakapapa or genealogy. Accordingly, all things were thought of as possessing a life force, or mauri. Very few Māori still adhere to traditional Māori beliefs — 3,699 respondents to the 2018 census identified themselves as adhering to "Māori religions, beliefs and philosophies".

Sikhism
 
Sikhs have been in New Zealand for more than a century, with the first arriving in Hamilton in the 1880s. There are now about 40,908 Sikhs in New Zealand, constituting 0.88% of the country's population. Sikhism is the fastest growing religion in New Zealand with the Sikh population in New Zealand having quadrupled since 2006 Sikhs have a strong presence in Auckland, and especially in South Auckland and Manukau, with the current National Party's Member of Parliament for Manukau Kanwal Singh Bakshi being a Sikh.
There were thirteen gurdwaras (the Sikh place of worship) in New Zealand in 2010. The largest, Kalgidhar Sahib, is situated in Auckland at Takanini.

Religion in culture and the arts

Although New Zealand is a largely secular country, religion finds a place in many cultural traditions. Major Christian events like Christmas and Easter are official public holidays and are celebrated by religious and non-religious alike, as in many countries around the world. The country's national anthem, God Defend New Zealand, mentions God in both its name and its lyrics. There has been occasional controversy over the degree of separation of church and state, for example the practice of prayer and religious instruction at school assemblies.

The architectural landscape of New Zealand attests to the historical importance of Christianity in New Zealand with church buildings prominent in cities, towns and the countryside. Notable Cathedrals include the Anglican Holy Trinity Cathedral, Auckland, ChristChurch Cathedral, Christchurch and Saint Paul's Cathedral, Wellington and the Catholic St Patrick's Cathedral, Auckland, Cathedral of the Blessed Virgin Mary, Hamilton, Cathedral of the Holy Spirit, Palmerston North, Sacred Heart Cathedral, Wellington, Cathedral of the Blessed Sacrament, Christchurch, St. Joseph's Cathedral, Dunedin. The iconic Futuna Chapel was built as a Wellington retreat center for the Catholic Marist order in 1961. The design by Maori architect John Scott, fuses Modernist and indigenous design principles.

Christian and Maori choral traditions have been blended in New Zealand to produce a distinct contribution to Christian music, including the popular hymns Whakaria Mai and Tama Ngakau Marie. From 1992 to 2014 New Zealand hosted one of the largest Christian music festivals in the Southern Hemisphere, the Parachute Music Festival.

Religion in politics

Religion has played and continues to play a 'significant and sometimes controversial role' in the politics of New Zealand. Most New Zealanders today consider politicians' religious beliefs to be a private matter.

Agnostic individuals in politics
Former Prime Ministers John Key and Helen Clark were agnostic, as is current prime minister Jacinda Ardern.

Christian individuals in politics

A large number of New Zealand prime ministers have been professing Christians, including Jenny Shipley, Jim Bolger, Geoffrey Palmer, David Lange, Robert Muldoon, Walter Nash, Keith Holyoake, and Michael Joseph Savage. Former Prime Minister Bill English is Catholic and has argued that religious groups should contribute to political discourse.

Sir Paul Reeves, Anglican Archbishop and Primate of New Zealand from 1980 to 1985, was appointed Governor-General from 1985 to 1990.

Murray Smith was a member of the New Zealand Parliament from 1972 to 1975. His interest in governance continued when he later enrolled in the Bahá’í Faith and contributed in national and international roles within the Bahá'í Community.

Christian political parties
Christian political parties have usually not gained significant support, a notable exception being the Christian Coalition (New Zealand) polling 4.4% in the 1996 general election. Christian parties have often been characterised by controversy and public disgrace. Many of these are now defunct, such as the Christian Democrat Party, the Christian Heritage Party which discontinued in 2006 after former leader Graham Capill was convicted as a child sex offender, Destiny New Zealand, The Family Party and the New Zealand Pacific Party whose leader, former Labour Party MP Taito Phillip Field was convicted on bribery and corruption charges. United Future was more successful, and although not a Christian party, had significant Christian backing.

The two main political parties, Labour and National, are not religious, although religious groups have at times played a significant role (e.g. the Rātana Movement). Politicians are often involved in public dialogue with religious groups. The Exclusive Brethren gained public notoriety during the 2005 election for distributing anti-Labour pamphlets, which former National Party leader Don Brash later admitted to knowledge of.

Separation of church and state
New Zealand has no state religion or established church.  However, the following anomalies exist:
 New Zealand's head of state or monarch must declare that they are a Protestant Christian and will uphold the Protestant succession according to the declaration required by the Accession Declaration Act 1910. 
 Section 3 of the Act of Settlement 1700 requires that the King or Queen of New Zealand must be a Protestant. 
 The title of the Queen of New Zealand includes the statement "by the Grace of God" and the title Defender of the Faith.

At the discussions leading to the Treaty of Waitangi Governor Hobson made a statement (albeit one which had no particular legal or constitutional significance) in defence of freedom of religion—sometimes called the 'fourth' article. In 2007, the government issued a National Statement on Religious Diversity containing in its first clause "New Zealand has no official or established religion." The statement caused controversy in some quarters, opponents citing that New Zealand's head of state, then Queen Elizabeth II, is required to be the supreme governor of the Church of England. However, Elizabeth II did not act in that capacity as the Queen of New Zealand. A poll of 501 New Zealanders in June 2007 found that 58% of respondents did not think Christianity should be New Zealand's official religion.

There has been increasing recognition of Māori spirituality in political discourse and even in certain government legislation. In July 2001 MP Rodney Hide alerted parliament to a state funded hikitapu (tapu-lifting) ceremony at the opening of the foreign embassy in Bangkok. It was revealed that the Ministry of Foreign Affairs and Trade had a standard policy of employing Māori ritual experts for the opening of official offices around the world. The Resource Management Act 1991 recognises the role of Māori spiritual beliefs in planning and environmental management. In 2002 local Māori expressed concerns that the development of the Auckland-Waikato expressway would disturb the taniwha, or guardian spirit, of the Waikato River, leading to delays and alterations to the project.

Before March 2019, blasphemous libel was a crime in New Zealand, but cases could only be prosecuted with the approval of the attorney-general, and the defence of opinion was allowed; the only prosecution, in 1922, was unsuccessful. In 1967, Presbyterian minister Professor Lloyd Geering faced charges of heresy brought by the Presbyterian Church, but the trial became stalemated and was abandoned.

The New Zealand Parliament opens its proceedings with a prayer. In November 2017 Christian language, including reference to Christ, was removed from the prayer.

See also

Irreligion in New Zealand
List of Christian organisations in New Zealand
List of New Zealand religious leaders
National Statement on Religious Diversity

References

Further reading

 Morrison, Hugh. "Globally and Locally Positioned: New Zealand Perspectives on the Current Practice of Religious History," Journal of Religious History (2011) 35#2 pp 181–198
 Simpson, Jane. "Women, Religion and Society in New Zealand: A Literature Review," Journal of Religious History (1994) 18#2 pp 198–218.

External links

Statistics New Zealand – religion affiliation summary.
Statistics New Zealand – full religious affiliation tables.